John Joe McGee (died 2002, Dundalk, County Louth, Ireland) was an IRA volunteer who was formerly in the British Special Boat Service.

Background
McGee had been a member of the Special Boat Service prior to joining the Irish Republican Army in the 1970s. He was a member of the Provisional IRA's 'nutting squad', the Internal Security Unit. He became its leader for around a decade between the mid-1980s to the mid-1990s. Between forty to fifty of those investigated by the unit were also executed as suspected informers or alleged British agents. Its sentences could only be countermanded by a member of the IRA Army Council. Members of the unit included Eamon Collins, Freddie Scappaticci, and "Kevin Fulton". During a court appearance, Fulton stated:

In 1979 I was approached by the Intelligence Corps, a branch of the British Army, whilst serving with my regiment the Royal Irish Rangers in Northern Ireland. I was asked to infiltrate a terrorist group, namely the PIRA during this time as part of my undercover work for the Force Research Unit. I was active in the commission of terrorist acts and crimes … During this time my handlers were fully conversant with my activities and had guided me in my work which included the security section of the PIRA. The commanding officer of this section was John Joe Magee, a former member of the Special Boat Squadron. The purpose of this unit was solely to hunt out agents and informers of the British state. The suspected agents would be … tortured and murdered after obtaining any information.

Eamon Collins (later killed by the IRA) quoted a conversation he had with McGee and Scappaticci in his book, Killing Rage:

I asked whether they always told people that they were going to be shot. Scap said it depended on the circumstances. He turned to John Joe (his boss, John Joe Magee) and started joking about one informer who had confessed after being offered an amnesty. Scap told the man he would take him home, reassuring him he had nothing to worry about. Scap had told him to keep the blindfold on for security reasons as they walked from the car. "It was funny," he (Scap) said, "watching the bastard stumbling and falling, asking me as he felt his way along railings and walls, "Is this my house now?" and I'd say, "No, not yet, walk on some more ..." " 'And then you shot the f---er in the back of the head," said John Joe, and both of them burst out laughing.

See also
 Internal Security Unit
 Stakeknife
 Murder of Jean McConville
 Murders of Catherine and Gerard Mahon
 Joseph Fenton
 Murder of Thomas Oliver
 Force Research Unit

External links
 Belfastelegraph.co.uk
 Theguardian.com
 Theage.com.au
 Independent.ie

2002 deaths
Irish republicans
Military personnel from Belfast
People from Dundalk
Provisional Irish Republican Army members
Special Boat Service personnel
Year of birth missing